The Royal Royal is a Canadian Christian contemporary worship music duo originating from Ontario, Canada. It is made up of two brothers, Gabriel and Nathan Finochio. The duo was active as of 2011 and is with Essential Records.

Music 
The band has released two EPs to date (Praise Him EP and Royal EP). It released its first studio album, The Royalty, on November 6, 2012 through Essential Records. They released their second album, The Return of the King, in 2014.

Discography

References

External links 

CCM Magazine
News Release Tuesday
Jesus Freak Hideout

Musical groups established in 2011
Musical groups from Ontario
Canadian musical duos
Canadian Christian rock groups
2011 establishments in Ontario